Maleh Rulan (also Romanized as Maleh Rūlān and Meleh Rūlān) is a village in Posht Tang Rural District, in the Central District of Sarpol-e Zahab County, Kermanshah Province, Iran. At the 2006 census, its population was 207, in 35 families.

References 

Populated places in Sarpol-e Zahab County